Robert Ernie "Babo" Castillo Jr. (April 18, 1955 – June 30, 2014) was an American professional baseball pitcher. He was in the bullpen for the Dodgers in the 1981 World Series, pitching one inning against the New York Yankees. Castillo is credited with teaching his former Dodgers team-mate, Fernando Valenzuela, how to throw a screwball.

Castillo died on June 30, 2014, from cancer at the age of 59.

References

External links

1955 births
2014 deaths
Albuquerque Dukes players
American baseball players of Mexican descent
American expatriate baseball players in Japan
American expatriate baseball players in Mexico
Baseball players from Los Angeles
Bravos de Reynosa players
Burials at Rose Hills Memorial Park
Chunichi Dragons players
Deaths from cancer in California
Gulf Coast Royals players
Los Angeles Dodgers players
Los Angeles Dodgers Legend Bureau
Los Angeles Valley Monarchs baseball players
Major League Baseball pitchers
Minnesota Twins players
Mexican League baseball pitchers
Nippon Professional Baseball pitchers
Sultanes de Monterrey players